Sheikh Hamed bin Butti Al Hamed was the father of the late Ahmed bin Hamed al Hamed and the uncle of the founder of the UAE. His other sons are Sheikh Shakhbut, Sheikh Zayed, Sheikh Khalid, Sheikh Hazza the sons of Sheikh Sultan.

Emirati royalty